Rise is the fifth studio album from Christian rap artist Trip Lee. The album was released in 2014, through Reach Records. The album includes features from Lecrae, Andy Mineo, and This'l among others. Four singles were released for the album; "Shweet", "Sweet Victory", "Manolo" and "Beautiful Life 2 (Mine)".

Concept
Trip Lee explained the concept of the album saying that; "It's a call-to-action to rise from the dead and actually live. We're born spiritually dead, and I'm calling for everyone to become spiritually alive. Secondly, don't wait until later to live the way you were created. God created you to honor Him, find joy, and serve others. Don't sleep on that. Lastly, rise above the low expectations people have."

Promotion
In promotion of the album Reach Records held two listening sessions in New York City and Atlanta. Tickets went on sale and were held on September 23 and October 3 respectively.

In late December 2014, Gawvi, who produced the album, released two remixes of songs from the Rise album, one of "Lazarus" and another of "Sweet Victory" for free on SoundCloud. In January 2015, Trip Lee announced the Rise Tour which he'll be embarking on until August 2015 in support of the album.

Book
Trip Lee wrote a book titled Rise: Get Up and Live in God's Great Story to accompany the album. It was released on January 27, 2015.

Critical reception

Signaling in a four star out of five review by CCM Magazine, Andy Argyrakis recognizes, "Rapper Trip Lee comes out swinging for the fences on his fifth long player and, in the process, is even more apt to have his influence rub off on the world at large." Michael Weaver, agrees it is a four star album for Jesus Freak Hideout, responding, "Musically more diverse than any of his previous works, Rise is just another example of Trip Lee growing and challenging himself as an artist." Adding a half star to his rating compared to the aforementioned, New Release Tuesday's Mark Ryan, realizing, "This album is brilliant. From top to bottom, each track keeps you on the edge of your seat, and on each listen you will hear something new" Anthony Peronto, indicating it is a five star project from Indie Vision Music, replies, "In what could be his last album, Trip Lee’s artistry and perseverance are present in every Gawvi-produced song."

Commercial performance
Rise debuted at No. 16 on the Billboard 200 with first-week sales of approximately 23,000 units, making it the fifth-highest charting Christian Hip Hop Album of all-time, as well as Trip Lee's highest charting album of his career.

Track listing

References

2014 albums
Trip Lee albums
Reach Records albums
Albums produced by Gawvi